Simpsonichthys punctulatus is a species of killifish from the family Rivulidae.
It is found in the temporary canals in the upper rio Paracatu drainage, in the rio São Francisco basin in Brazil in South America. 

References

punctulatus
Taxa named by Wilson José Eduardo Moreira da Costa
Taxa named by Gilberto Campello Brasil
Fish described in 2007
Freshwater fish of Brazil